The Tuŏn Line is an electrified  long freight-only railway line of the Korean State Railway in Tanch'ŏn, South Hamgyŏng Province, North Korea, running between Omongri on the P'yŏngra Line and Yŏhaejin at the junction of the P'yŏngra and Hambuk Lines. The line serves the large Tanch'ŏn Refinery and the Tanch'ŏn Magnesia Factory at Tuŏn.

Route 

A yellow background in the "Distance" box indicates that section of the line is not electrified.

References

Railway lines in North Korea
Standard gauge railways in North Korea